Patara or Badara is a village de facto in the Askeran Province of the breakaway Republic of Artsakh, de jure in the Khojaly District of Azerbaijan, in the disputed region of Nagorno-Karabakh. The village has an ethnic Armenian-majority population, and also had an Armenian majority in 1989.

Toponymy 
The village was historically known as Ptretsik.

History 

During the Soviet period, the village was a part of the Askeran District of the Nagorno-Karabakh Autonomous Oblast.

After the 2020 Nagorno-Karabakh war, Artsakh launched the construction of a new settlement for IDPs in the area between Patara and the neighboring village of Astghashen, for people displaced from the villages of Sghnakh, Jraghatsner, Madatashen and Moshkhmhat in the Askeran Province. The village was heavily bombarded during the Second Nagorno-Karabakh War, and much of its territory is littered with unexploded ammunition.

Historical heritage sites 
Historical heritage sites in and around the village include the small chapel of Drbasut Yeghtsi, a cemetery from between the 9th and 13th centuries, a village, cemetery, and khachkar from between the 10th and 13th centuries, a 12th/13th-century fortress, the church of Tsera Nahatak built in 1326, the 12th/13th-century monastery of Okhty Yeghtsi, the 12th/13th-century monastery of Otskavank, the 13th-century church of Surb Amenaprkich, the restored three-nave St. Stephen's Church built in 1870, and a 19th-century watermill.

Economy and culture 
The population is mainly engaged in agriculture and animal husbandry. As of 2015, the village has a municipal building, a secondary school, a house of culture, two shops, and a medical centre.

Demographics 
The village had 849 inhabitants in 2005, and 815 inhabitants in 2015.

Gallery

References

External links 

 
 

Populated places in Askeran Province
Populated places in Khojaly District